Richhpal Ram VC (20 August 1899 – 12 February 1941) was an Indian recipient of the Victoria Cross, the highest and most prestigious award for gallantry in the face of the enemy that can be awarded to British and Commonwealth forces.

His family
Richhpal Ram came from Barda village, tehsil Satnali district Bhiwani in Haryana. He belongs to Jat family of Lamba. He had 2 sons & 1 daughter.

Career 
Ram enlisted on 20 August 1920 in the 4/6th Rajputana Rifles.

He was 41 years old, and a Subedar in the 6th Rajputana Rifles, in the  Indian Army during World War II when the following deed took place for which he was awarded the VC during the Battle of Keren.

On 7 February 1941 at Keren, Eritrea, Subadar Richhpal Ram led a successful attack on the enemy and subsequently repelled six counter-attacks and then, without a shot left, brought the few survivors of his company back. Five days later, when leading another attack, his right foot was blown off, but he continued to encourage his men until he died.

The official citation for the award, published in The London Gazette on 4 July 1941 reads:

The medal
The Victoria Cross Medal is displayed in Delhi Cantonment Raj Rifles Officer Mess (Museum).

See also
 East African Campaign (World War II)

References

External links
Charcoal, ink and Gouache picture of Subadar Richpal Ram in The Art of War exhibition at the UK National Archives together with links to Document WO 373/28, the original citation recommending the award signed by Ram's battalion commander.

1899 births
1941 deaths
Indian World War II recipients of the Victoria Cross
British Indian Army officers
Indian Army personnel killed in World War II
People from Bhiwani district